Hazel Joan Rowley (16 November 1951 – 1 March 2011) was a British-born Australian author and biographer.

Born in London, Rowley emigrated with her parents to Adelaide at the age of eight. She studied at the University of Adelaide, graduating with Honours in French and German. Later she acquired a PhD in French. She taught literary studies at Deakin University in Melbourne, before moving to the United States.

Rowley's first published biography, of Australian novelist Christina Stead, was critically acclaimed and won the National Book Council's "Banjo" Award for non-fiction in 1994. It was shortlisted for the 1993 Colin Roderick Award. Her next biographical work was about the African American writer Richard Wright. Her best-known book, Tête-à-tête (2005), covers the lives of Simone de Beauvoir and Jean-Paul Sartre (de Beauvoir had been the subject of Rowley's PhD thesis). Her last published book is Franklin & Eleanor: An Extraordinary Marriage, about Franklin and Eleanor Roosevelt (2011).

Rowley suffered a cerebral hemorrhage in New York in February 2011 and died there on 1 March, aged 59.

Legacy 
The annual Hazel Rowley Literary Fellowship was set up in her memory in 2011, with Mary Hoban the inaugural winner in 2012.

Bibliography
Christina Stead: A Biography (1994)
Richard Wright: The Life and Times (2001)
Tête-à-tête: The Lives and Loves of Simone de Beauvoir & Jean-Paul Sartre (2005)
Franklin & Eleanor: An Extraordinary Marriage (2010)

References

External links
 Hazel Rowley 1951–2011, The Book Show (ABC Radio National)

1951 births
2011 deaths
Australian biographers
Australian expatriates in the United States
Academic staff of Deakin University
English emigrants to Australia
University of Adelaide alumni
Writers from London
20th-century Australian women writers
20th-century Australian writers
20th-century biographers
21st-century Australian women writers
21st-century Australian writers
21st-century biographers
Women biographers